Surf Curse is an American surf rock band formed in 2013 in Reno, Nevada, and now based out of Los Angeles. Created by Nick Rattigan (lead vocals and  drums) and Jacob Rubeck (guitars), the band now also includes Henry Dillon and Noah Kholl. The band achieved mainstream success after their song "Freaks", written in 2011 and first released in 2013, became popular on the short-form video platform TikTok in 2020.

History 

Surf Curse was formed in 2013 by Nick Rattigan and Jacob Rubeck in Reno, Nevada, initially under several other names including "Buffalo 66" in reference to the film of the same name. The band soon moved to Los Angeles, where they played at The Smell, a club that welcomed bands with similar sounds to that of Surf Curse's punk-surf rock. There, they became a part of the local all-ages punk scene. Simultaneously, Rattigan continued working on his solo project, performing as Current Joys. Also in 2013, the band independently released both the EP Sad Boys and their debut album Buds. The latter featured the song "Freaks", written in 2011 when Rattigan and Rubeck were both aged 18.

The band established a growing Los Angeles fanbase, allowing them to play at the October 2016 Beach Goth Festival before an audience that included non-local attendees. Their second album, Nothing Yet, was released in January 2017 through Danger Collective. Rattigan and Rubeck described Nothing Yet as reflecting their lifelong influence by movies, saying that the song "The Strange and the Kind" could fit on the soundtrack of a modern Dazed and Confused. The band remained somewhat successful, albeit underground, through the 2019 release of their third album, Heaven Surrounds You. This third album was praised for Rattigan's vocals and its lead track "Disco", with its fast pace compared favorably to Vampire Weekend's debut, but criticized for reliance on clichés within its lyrics. The lyrics of the album's final song "Jamie" and its repeated line of "I love the people in my life, all my friends keep me alive" have been identified as particularly moving.

With the onset of the COVID-19 pandemic and ensuing lockdowns in 2020, Surf Curse were unable to continue performing live. However, in 2020, the song "Freaks" began drawing attention on the short-form video platform TikTok. The song's angsty lyrics, particularly "I am just a freak", made it compatible with TikTok meme formats that played it in the background. "Freaks" has been described as a "soundtrack [for] whatever you're cringing about", though its second life on TikTok has been distinguished from other songs that saw a resurgence on the app. Generally, songs that received renewed interest through TikTok were recently featured in movies of television shows, unlike the rather obscurity that "Freaks" had previously enjoyed. Rattigan said he would have also been happy with the song gaining traction had it been featured on the soundtrack to the then-upcoming film Avatar: The Way of Water; Rubeck joked that the unusual variety of videos featuring the song—including gardening tutorials and thirst traps—meant they "had to just stop watching them". The two said that they neither understood nor used TikTok.

The popularity of "Freaks" came almost simultaneously with accusations that both Rattigan and Rubeck engaged in sexual misconduct with fans. Danger Collective severed ties with Surf Curse at the time of the allegations. An anonymous allegation against Rubeck was retracted and two against Rattigan were similarly deleted; both band members denied the allegations. In August 2020, Rubeck stated: "There hasn't been a moment in my life that even comes close to what was described in that post." The allegations were made around the same time that Burger Records, which had organized the 2016 Goth Beach Festival, folded during a wave of similar allegations in the Southern California punk scene.

After being rereleased as a single in May 2021 following the band signing with Atlantic Records, "Freaks" reached number 64 on the UK Singles Chart and number 17 on Billboard Hot Rock & Alternative Songs, eight years after it first appeared on Buds. The song is RIAA certified Platinum and, has more than 650 million streams. Billboard recognized Surf Curse as the second-ranked artists of 2021 in their category New Rock Artists.

Following their signing to Atlantic Records, Surf Curse added bassist Henry Dillon and guitarist Noah Kholl to their lineup. Both Dillon and Kholl had toured with the band pre-pandemic; Rattigan said of adding them: "I think the sort of the connection that me and Jacob felt with each other when we started the band, we also felt with Noah and Henry." As a now four-member band, Surf Curse released Magic Hour in 2022. As with their other album covers that featured the band members, all four are featured on the cover art of the album. The album's release had been preceded by the band performing at Coachella in Wizard of Oz–themed attire and the launch of the album's lead single "Sugar". The band began their North America tour for Magic Hour with a concert in Las Vegas on October 30, 2022, where each band member was dressed as a different iteration of Elvis Presley. Magic Hour was received positively by critics, who identified its lyrics as more creative and a positive evolution of the band's sound and talent.

Musical style 
Surf Curse's music has been described as surf rock, lo-fi, garage pop, surf punk, post-punk, surf pop, indie rock, indie pop, and jangle pop. The band's live performances have been characterized as "bedlam" and "bonkers", with Rattigan saying that a particularly energetic set at Pappy & Harriet's resulted in the venue banning the band.

Members 
 Jacob Rubeck – guitar 
 Nick Rattigan – lead vocals, drums
 Noah Kholl – guitar
 Henry Dillon – bass

Discography

Studio albums

EPs

Singles

Notes

References 

Atlantic Records artists
Indie rock musical groups from Nevada
musical groups established in 2013
Musical groups from Los Angeles
Post-punk music groups
Surf music groups
2013 establishments in Nevada